A locrio is a rice dish from the Dominican Republic. Similar to pilaf and paella, it consists of seasoned rice with some kind of meat, such as chicken, Dominican salami or pork.

Origin
The locrio is possibly a Dominican adaptation of paella.

Types
Besides chicken, locrio is also commonly made of Dominican salami, guineafowl, rabbit, pork chops, arenque (dried herring), shellfish, or sardines (often called pica-pica).

See also 
Arroz junto, rice cooked with beans and meat in one pot 
Arroz con gandules, rice with pigeon peas, salami, and pork 
Arroz con maiz, rice with corn and sausage
Arroz con pollo, rice with chicken

References

Dominican Republic cuisine
Sausage dishes
Pork dishes
Chicken and rice dishes